Living with Mother-in-Law is a television drama series produced by Vietnam Television Film Center, Vietnam Television, directed by Vũ Trường Khoa. It aired from 5 April to 30 June 2017, every Wednesday to Friday (last four episodes aired on Thursday and Friday) at 20:45.

Story 
The film discusses the conflicts and problems in the relationship between Minh Vân (Bảo Thanh) and her mother-in-law, Phương (Lan Hương), when living under the same roof. At the same time, the young husband/son - Thanh (Anh Dũng) in the film must stand in the middle of the "war" between his mother and wife. It is also the root of discordance between the newly-wed couple and damage to the family relationship. As shown in the series, many other couples also suffer from conflicts, which stem from their mother-in-law.

Cast

Main 
 Lan Hương as Phương (Thanh's mother)
 Bảo Thanh as Minh Vân
 Anh Dũng as Thanh
 Trần Đức as Phương (Thanh's father)
 Nguyễn Phúc Lưu Lan Hương as Mrs. Bang (Van's mother)
 Nguyễn Công Lý as Mr. Bang (Van's father)
 Thu Quỳnh as Trang (Vân's best friend)
 Danh Tùng as Tùng (Trang's husband)
 Việt Anh as Sơn
 Minh Phương as Dieu (Tùng's mother)

Supporting 
 Thanh Tú as Bích (Bằng's sister)
 Thanh Hương as Như (Vân's coworker)
 Hương Giang as Trâm (Vân's coworker)
 Nguyễn Ngọc Thoa as Phương's mother
 Thu Hà as Hằng
 Trang Cherry as Diệp
 Trang Moon as Thảo (Tùng's sister)
 Thế Nguyễn as Linh (Vân's brother)
 Vân Anh as Nhật (Linh's girlfriend)
 Anh Đức as Long (Vân's old coworker)
 Hoàng Anh as Chief
 Mạnh Cường as Cường (Vân's boss)
 Cẩm Vân as Chi
 Diệp Bích as Neighbour
 Thu Huyền as Phương's neighborhood

Awards 

 2017 VTV Awards: Impressive Actress (Bảo Thanh)

References 

Vietnamese telenovelas
2017 Vietnamese television series debuts
2017 Vietnamese television series endings